Neo Cheimonio is a village in the municipality of Orestiada in the northern part of the Evros regional unit in Greece. It is 6 km south of the centre of Orestiada.  Neo Cheimonio is situated on the Greek National Road 51 (Feres - Soufli - Didymoteicho - Orestiada - Ormenio - Svilengrad), and has a station on the Ormenio - Didymoteicho railway. It is about 5 km west of the river Evros, that forms the border with Turkey here. The nearest village is Thourio to the south. It was annexed by Greece in 1920, prior it was ruled by the Ottomans.

Population

The town is populated by Arvanites.

See also
List of settlements in the Evros regional unit

External links
Official Website
Neo Chimonio on GTP Travel Pages

References

Populated places in Evros (regional unit)
Orestiada
Albanian communities of Western Thrace